Trul khor ('magical instrument' or 'magic circle;' Skt. ), in full tsa lung trul khor ( 'magical movement instrument, channels and inner breath currents'),  also known as yantra yoga, is a Vajrayana discipline which includes pranayama (breath control) and body postures (asanas). From the perspective of the  Indo-Tibetan Buddhist traditions of Dzogchen, the mind is merely vāyu (breath) in the body. Thus working with vāyu and the body is paramount, while meditation, on the other hand, is considered contrived and conceptual.

 Namkhai Norbu Rinpoche (1938-2018), a proponent of trul khor, preferred to use the equivalent Sanskrit-derived English term 'yantra yoga' when writing in English. Trul khor derives from the instructions of the Indian mahasiddhas (great sages) who founded Vajrayana (3rd to 13th centuries CE).

Trul khor traditionally consists of 108 movements, including bodily movements (or dynamic asanas), incantations (or mantras), pranayama and  visualizations. 

The walls of the Dalai Lama's summer temple of Lukhang depict trul khor asanas.

Lung

Lung ( rlung) means wind or breath. It is a key concept in the Vajrayana traditions of Tibetan Buddhism and has a variety of meanings. Lung is a concept that is particularly important to understandings of the illusory body and the trikaya (body, speech and mind). The 'illusory body', which is often referred to as the 'vajra body' in medieval Tibetan Buddhist discourse, is constituted by the flow of subtle energy currents: 
'rlung' (Wylie) is equivalent to Sanskrit: prāna or vāyu.
'rtsa' (Wylie) is equivalent to Sanskrit: nāḍī, sirā, srota and dhamanī;

Channels

Yantra yoga
Namkhai Norbu was the first to discuss trul khor in his book on yantra yoga, essentially a commentary on a practical yoga manual by Vairotsana.  Namkhai Norbu began dissemination of Yantra Yoga through his practical teaching and esoteric transmission of this discipline within the International Dzogchen Community, which he founded some time after 1975 in Italy, Merigar.

Chaoul (2006) has begun discussion of Bon traditions of Trul Khor in English with his thesis from Rice University. In his work, Chaoul makes reference to a commentary by the famed Bonpo Dzogchen master, Shardza Tashi Gyaltsen.

Tenzin Wangyal Rinpoche's text Awakening the Sacred Body presents some of the basic practices of trul khor according to the Tibetan Bön tradition.

Primary texts

Shardza Tashi Gyaltsen: byang zab nam mkha' mdzod chen las snyan rgyud rtsa rlung 'phrul 'khor

See also
Desi Sangye Gyatso
Six yogas of Naropa
Vairotsana
Padmasambhava

References

Citations

Works cited
 Chaoul-Reich, Alejandro. Spinning the Magical Wheel  in The Snow Lion Newsletter. Snow Lion Publications.  Retrieved 1 December 2006.
 Chaoul-Reich, Alejandro. Tibetan Yoga from the Bon Tradition in Snow Lion Magazine. Snow Lion Publications.
 Lipson, Elaine. Into the Mystic in Yoga Journal.
 Norbu, Chögyal Namkhai (2000). Revision:  Laura Evangelisti. Translation: Des Barry, Nina Robinson, Liz Granger, Carol Chaney. Yantra Yoga Manual. Italy, Shang Shung Edizioni. (This booklet is published for those who have received the transmission of these practices from Chögyal Namkhai Norbu Rinpoche.)
 Yogic practices in the Bon tradition by M Alejandro Chaoul
 Ancient drawing from the Blue Beryl by Sangye Gyamtso (1653-1705)
 Lipman, Kennard (1987).'The Dynamic Yoga of Tibet: combining asanas, breathing exercises, and flowing movements, Yantra Yoga aims to return us to our "natural state".' Cited in: Yoga Journal, May 1987, No. 74. Active Interest Media. . Source:  (accessed: Friday April 9, 2010) p. 46-49

Further reading

External links
 Literature from the Tibetan Tradition Relevant to Six Yogas of Naropa Practitioners - An Annotated Bibliography and Selected Excerpts

Dzogchen practices
Tibetan Buddhist practices
Tibetan words and phrases
Vajrayana practices